Mikko Korhonen (born 23 July 1980) is a Finnish professional golfer who currently plays on the European Tour. He won the 2018 Shot Clock Masters and the 2019 Volvo China Open.

Professional career
Korhonen turned professional at the late age of 24, and spent the initial part of his career on the third-tier Nordic League tour. In 2006 he stepped up to the Challenge Tour, where he enjoyed five productive seasons, never winning but never finishing worse than 73rd in the final standings.

At the end of 2010, Korhonen progressed to the European Tour for the first time via qualifying school, but failed to retain his card for 2011. Korhonen returned to the Challenge Tour in 2012. In late 2012 he had his best result in a Challenge Tour event, finishing tied for third place in the Crowne Plaza Copenhagen Challenge and also progressed to the 2013 European Tour through qualifying school.

Since 2013 Korhonen has played on the European Tour, although he struggled in the 2013 and 2014 seasons and only retained his place on the tour through the qualifying school. In October 2016, he finished tied for third in the Portugal Masters, while in 2017 he was twice runner-up, in March in the Tshwane Open and in the Lyoness Open in June.

In 2018, Korhonen had more success in the Tshwane Open, finishing in third place. He achieved his first win on the European Tour in June 2018 at the Shot Clock Masters, winning by six strokes from Connor Syme. Korhonen was making his 146th European Tour and made 12 attempts at qualifying school before 2014.

Korhonen won the 2019 Volvo China Open after a playoff for his second European Tour success. He made a birdie-3 at the first extra hole to defeat Benjamin Hébert after the pair had tied at 20-under-par.

Professional wins (2)

European Tour wins (2)

1Co-sanctioned by the Asian Tour

European Tour playoff record (1–0)

Results in major championships
Results not in chronological order before 2019.

CUT = missed the half-way cut
"T" = tied for place

Team appearances
Amateur
European Boys' Team Championship (representing Finland): 1998
Jacques Léglise Trophy (representing the Continent of Europe): 1998
European Youths' Team Championship (representing Finland): 2000
Eisenhower Trophy (representing Finland): 2004

Professional
World Cup (representing Finland): 2008, 2013, 2018

See also
2010 European Tour Qualifying School graduates
2012 European Tour Qualifying School graduates
2013 European Tour Qualifying School graduates
2014 European Tour Qualifying School graduates

References

External links

Finnish male golfers
European Tour golfers
Sportspeople from Uusimaa
People from Mäntsälä
1980 births
Living people
21st-century Finnish people